Jefferson Christian Academy is a private K–12 Baptist school in Ripplemead, Giles County, Virginia. Founded in 1994, the school has an enrollment of about 121 students.

References

External links
 Jefferson Christian Academy website

Christian schools in Virginia
Educational institutions established in 1994
Schools in Giles County, Virginia
Nondenominational Christian schools in the United States
Private K-12 schools in Virginia
1994 establishments in Virginia